Dimitar Ilievski-Murato (1953 in Bitola – 10 May 1989 in Mount Everest) was an alpinist from SR Macedonia representing SFR Yugoslavia, the first national of modern North Macedonia ever to climb the highest peak of the world, Mount Everest. He died on the descent of Mt. Everest.

Murato, as he was known in his native town Bitola, reached the top of Mount Everest on 10 May 1989 as part of a larger Yugoslavian expedition, of which only few alpinists succeeded to reach the peak. He is noted as the 264th summiter of Mount Everest.

After reaching the summit, he put the flags of both former SFR Yugoslavia and SR Macedonia.

In his honour, a traditional memorial march to Pelister named after him is organized every year around the date of his biggest achievement and tragedy.

References 

Aromanian people
Summiters of Mount Everest
1953 births
1989 deaths
Macedonian mountain climbers
Yugoslav mountain climbers
Mountaineering deaths on Mount Everest
People from Bitola
Macedonian people of Aromanian descent